Thera otisi is a species of geometrid moth in the family Geometridae. It is found in North America.

The MONA or Hodges number for Thera otisi is 7219.

References

Further reading

 
 
 
 

Hydriomenini